S. Alagarsamy (5 August 1926 – 6 March 2009) was an Indian politician and was elected as  Member of the Legislative Assembly for 5 terms from 1967 to 1991 to the Tamil Nadu Legislative Assembly as a Communist Party of India candidate from Kovilpatti constituency  in 1967, 1971, 1977, 1980 and 1989 elections.

Early life
He was born on 5 August 1926 to A. Soliah and S.Koppammal in a village Ramanoothu, Tuticorin Dist, Tamil Nadu. Having lost his father at the age of 13, he had to take on the responsibilities of taking care of their agricultural farming. He and his younger brother S.Ramasamy were brought up by their widowed mother and aunt.

Political career

He first contested for Madras State Assembly in 1957 and continued to contest in all subsequent State General Assembly Elections till 1989 from Kovilpatti constituency Prior to that he contested for Unified Tirunelveli Jilla Board in 1952. 

The then unified Tirunelveli district consisted of the present Tirunelveli, Tuticorin, Kannayakumari Districts and part of Malabar and Ramnad District. He was leader of the CPI Legislative Group from 1971 till 1991 in The Tamil Nadu Legislative Assembly.

Thiru C.N.Annadurai was the Chief Minister of Tamil Nadu, when he was the Member of the Legislative  Assembly in 1967 and subsequently he continued to be M.L.A, when Thiru V.R. Nedunchezhiyan, Thiru. M. Karunanidhi  and Thiru M. G. Ramachandran,  were the Chief Ministers of  Tamil Nadu.

He was affectionately called  " Annachi " by his thousands of followers and others . He  gained respect and great loyal following due to his leadership,honesty, simplicity, loyalty, hardwork, and openness. These qualities enabled him to win the Assembly Election continuously irrespective of the political waves.

Electoral records

Madras State Assembly

Tamil Nadu Assembly

Public office held
He held various public offices in Kovilpatti Taluk for many years-  President of Ramanoothu Village, Elementary School Management Board President, Milk Society and Housing Society President, Marketing Society President . He also served as board of Director in various co-operative organisations and banks. He was member of District Development Council for Tirunelveli  and Tuticorin Districts. He was heading Tamil Nadu Kishan Sabha organisation and Vice President of All India Kishan Sabha . Leader of  Tamil Nadu State Assembly CPI Group.  He served in various  Tamil Nadu Government Legislative Committees. He served as State Executive Committee Member and State Control Committee President of Communist Party of India.

References

External links
 1957 Tamil Nadu Election Results, Election Commission of India
 1962 Tamil Nadu Election Results, Election Commission of India
 1984 Tamil Nadu Election Results, Election Commission of India 
 
 S. Alagarsamy
  S. Alagarsamy Trust

Communist Party of India politicians from Tamil Nadu
1926 births
2009 deaths
People from Tirunelveli district
Tamil Nadu MLAs 1967–1972
Tamil Nadu MLAs 1971–1976
Tamil Nadu MLAs 1977–1980
Tamil Nadu MLAs 1980–1984
Tamil Nadu MLAs 1989–1991